Eric Jamili (born May 20, 1977 in Silay, Negros Occidental, Philippines) is a retired Filipino professional boxer. He won the vacant WBO minimumweight title in December 1997 with an eighth round technical knockout of Englishman Mickey Cantwell in London. He lost the title in his first defense to Kermin Guardia six months later.

Eric is the younger brother of one-time world title challenger Reynante Jamili. Both trained out of the Elorde Boxing stable of Paranaque City, Philippines.

Professional career
Jamili turned professional in 1995, beginning his career with a modest record of 5-5-1. Jamili then won the next five of his bouts, capturing the WBO Inter-Continental minimumweight title and earning a shot at the WBO minimumweight title against Englishman Mickey Cantwell that had been vacated by Ricardo López (boxer).

Jamili traveled to London in December 1997 to face Cantwell, and managed to cut him in the first round. Jamili's longer reach and tricky southpaw style befuddled Cantwell, who was hampered by the cut. Referee Mark Nelson halted the bout at 1:22 of the eighth round due to the cut, awarding the championship to Jamili.

Jamili lost the title in May 1998 with a fifth round technical knockout loss to Kermin Guardia. Jamili, who had arrived in the fight location of Las Vegas, Nev. just two days prior to the bout, was knocked down prior to the end of the fourth round. In a rematch in March 1999, Jamili knocked Guardia down in rounds 4 and 9, but lost a unanimous decision.

Jamili received a shot at the IBF minimumweight title against Zolani Petelo in May 1999. Jamili was knocked out with a left hook to the body at 1:21 of the first round.

Jamili would fight just six more times afterwards, going 2-3-1 with all three losses by knockout before retiring in 2003.

External links

1977 births
Mini-flyweight boxers
Living people
World boxing champions
World Boxing Organization champions
People from Silay
Boxers from Negros Occidental
Filipino male boxers